The brook hooktail (Paragomphus henryi) is a species of dragonfly in the family Gomphidae. It is endemic to Sri Lanka.

See also
 List of odonates of Sri Lanka

References

 henryi.html World Dragonflies
 Animal diversity web
 IUCN Red List
 Query Results
 Sri Lanka Biodiversity

Gomphidae
Insects described in 1928